= Bublin coiled-coil protein =

Protein-coding gene in the species Homo sapiens

BBLN

Identifiers
- Aliases: BBLN, EST00098, chromosome 9 open reading frame 16, bublin coiled coil protein, C9orf16
- External IDs: MGI: 1920987; HomoloGene: 41552; GeneCards: BBLN; OMA:BBLN - orthologs

Gene location (Human)
Chr.	Chromosome 9 (human)
Band	9q34.11	Start	128,160,265 bp
Band	9q34.11	End	128,163,924 bp

Gene location (Mouse)
Chr.	Chromosome 2 (mouse)
Band	2|2 B	Start	32,267,109 bp
Band	2|2 B	End	32,271,950 bp
RNA expression pattern
Bgee	Human / Mouse (ortholog); Top expressed in: right adrenal cortex; left adrenal cortex; amygdala; right frontal lobe; cingulate gyrus; anterior cingulate cortex; prefrontal cortex; Region I of hippocampus proper; dorsolateral prefrontal cortex; skin of leg / Top expressed in: facial motor nucleus; primary visual cortex; superior frontal gyrus; primary motor cortex; prefrontal cortex; perirhinal cortex; anterior horn of spinal cord; granulocyte; lip; adrenal gland; More reference expression data
BioGPS	n/a
Gene ontology
Molecular function	protein binding; molecular function
Cellular component	cellular component
Biological process	biological process
Sources:Amigo / QuickGO
Orthologs
Species	Human	Mouse
Entrez	79095	73737
Ensembl	ENSG00000171159	ENSMUSG00000039195
UniProt	Q9BUW7	P58686
RefSeq (mRNA)	NM_024112	NM_198001
RefSeq (protein)	NP_077017	NP_932118
Location (UCSC)	Chr 9: 128.16 – 128.16 Mb	Chr 2: 32.27 – 32.27 Mb
PubMed search
- Wikidata
View/Edit Human	View/Edit Mouse

Bublin coiled-coil protein is a protein in humans that is encoded by the BBLN gene.
